The Political Academy of the Socialist Party of Albania or simply Political Academy (short: AP) is the first academy of modern left-wing leadership in Albania. It is an academy established by the Socialist Party of Albania and the contribution of the Friedrich Ebert Foundation. The academy holds its lectures in Golem, near Durrës.

Staff and lecturers
Political Academy staff consists of professors and professionals. Lecturers are politicians, parliamentarians, leaders, diplomats, university professors and analysts, scholars and journalists.

Some of the lecturers of Political Academy are:
 Alfred Moisiu, was the fourth President of the Republic of Albania
 Servet Pëllumbi, was Chairman of the Parliament of Albania
 Namik Dokle, was Chairman of the Parliament of Albania
 Arben Malaj, Minister of Finance and Economy of Albania 1997 - 2005
 Paskal Milo, Albanian historian, politician, and leader of the Social Democracy Party of Albania
 Shkëlqim Cani, former Governor of the Bank of Albania
 Pëllumb Xhufi, historian and former Vice Chairman of Socialist Movement for Integration
 Arta Dade, former Minister of Foreign Affairs of Albania, now Member of the Socialist Party of Albania to the Parliament of Albania
 Ermelinda Meksi, former Member of the Socialist Party of Albania to the Parliament of Albania, now member of the executive board of the Bank of Albania
 Mimi Kodheli, Member of the Socialist Party of Albania to the Parliament of Albania
 Gramoz Ruçi, Chairman of the parliamentary group of Socialist Party of Albania
 Valentina Leskaj, Member of the Socialist Party of Albania to the Parliament of Albania
 Preç Zogaj, former Member of the Democratic Party of Albania to the Parliament of Albania
 Erion Braçe, Member of the Socialist Party of Albania to the Parliament of Albania
 Fatmir Xhafaj, Member of the Socialist Party of Albania to the Parliament of Albania
 Ditmir Bushati, Member of the Socialist Party of Albania to the Parliament of Albania
 Taulant Balla, Member of the Socialist Party of Albania to the Parliament of Albania
 Et'hem Ruka, Member of the Socialist Party of Albania to the Parliament of Albania and former Minister of Environment
 Ben Blushi, Member of the Socialist Party of Albania to the Parliament of Albania and former Minister of State, Local Government and Decentralization of Albania
 Blendi Klosi, Member of the Socialist Party of Albania to the Parliament of Albania
 Luan Hajdaraga, former Minister of Interior of Albania
 Lisien Bashkurti, former Albanian Ambassador to Hungary, Deputy Chairman of the Red and Black Alliance
 Henri Çili, creator of European University of Tirana
 Ilir Zela, creator of FRESH
 Musa Ulqini, former Member of the Socialist Party of Albania to the Parliament of Albania
 Lorenc Vangjeli, journalist
 Luan Omari, jurist
 Maqo Lakrori
 Përparim Kabo
 Adriana Berberi
 Majlinda Dhuka
 Bashkim Rama
 Endri Fuga
 Elteva Bisha
 Genci Gjonçaj

AP Program
The knowledge acquired will enable students:
 to be involved directly in decision-making processes and political functioning of the Socialist Party and the Socialist Party Parliamentary Group;
 To understand Albania's problems in the political, economic and social;
 Put into practice their knowledge by proposing solutions to problems;
 Suggest ways to accelerate the pace of development;
 Engage in political processes of decision making in local and national level.

Activities
The method of teaching includes discourse, dialogue and interactive learning, debate, group work, case studies, role plays, presentations, and incentives.

See also
 Friedrich Ebert Foundation
 Socialist Party of Albania

References

External links
Akademia Politikie (in Albanian)

Educational organizations based in Albania
Political and economic think tanks based in Europe
Socialism in Albania
Socialist Party of Albania
Buildings and structures in Kavajë